Jambes is the name of the railway station in the Belgian town of Jambes. The station is operated by the national railway company SNCB/NMBS.

Train services
The station is served by the following services:
Intercity services (IC 17) Dinant - Jambes - Namur - Schaarbeek
Local services Jambes - Ottignies

Railway stations in Belgium
Railway stations in Namur (province)